Haugesunds Social-Demokrat was a Norwegian newspaper, published in Haugesund in Rogaland county. It was affiliated with the Social Democratic Labour Party of Norway.

Haugesunds Social-Demokrat was started in 1921, the same year the Social Democratic Labour Party broke away from the Norwegian Labour Party. In 1926, Haugesunds Social-Demokrat was incorporated into the Labour Party newspaper Haugesunds Arbeiderblad. In 1927, the Social Democratic Labour Party reconciled with the Labour Party, and the two parties again became one.

References

1921 establishments in Norway
1926 disestablishments in Norway
Defunct newspapers published in Norway
Mass media in Haugesund
Norwegian-language newspapers
Newspapers established in 1921
Publications disestablished in 1926
Social Democratic Labour Party of Norway newspapers